Frank & Seder Building may refer to:
 Frank & Seder Building (Detroit)
 Frank & Seder Building (Pittsburgh)